The Black Gang was the second Bulldog Drummond novel. It was published in 1922 and written by H. C. McNeile under the pen name Sapper.

Premise
Following his experiences in Bulldog Drummond, Bulldog Drummond forms an organisation (the titular Black Gang) to operate, using brutal and illegal means, against left-wing movements in England. Alarmed by setbacks caused by the gang's activities, Carl Peterson, who is secretly the mastermind behind the left-wing movements, comes to England in disguise, accompanied by the femme fatale Irma, to stamp out the gang and gain revenge on Drummond for the events of the first novel.

References

Bibliography

External links
 

1922 British novels
British crime novels
English novels
Hodder & Stoughton books